Richard Strankman (born June 20, 1953) is a Canadian politician who was an elected member to the Legislative Assembly of Alberta, representing the electoral district of Drumheller-Stettler, from 2012 to 2019.

Strankman serves on both the Standing Committee on Private Bills and the legislative policy committee on Alberta’s Economic Future. Strankman had served in several critic roles, including Tourism, Parks and Recreation, as well as Agriculture.

He resigned from the United Conservative caucus on January 15, 2019, and ran in the 2019 Alberta general election as an independent. Although he was not re-elected, he was one of only two candidates in the general election not representing the two largest parties (the UCP and the Alberta New Democratic Party) to finish in second place (the other such runner-up was incumbent Alberta Party MLA Greg Clark).

Career
Strankman has owned and operated a farming business since 1973. From 1999 to 2011 he also volunteered as secretary/treasurer of the Western Barley Growers Association. Although initially interested in agriculture, Strankman became increasingly involved in politics and social activism in response to federal regulation of the agriculture industry, including legislation relating to the Canadian Wheat Board. His commitment to public service began early on and as a youth Strankman was honoured with the Queen’s scout award by Boy Scouts of Canada. Strankman also has a keen interest in aviation and has held a pilot’s licence and done aerial application since 1974.

Strankman was jailed in 2002 after being charged under the Customs Act for taking 756 bushels of wheat across the U.S. border in protest of the Canadian Wheat Board's monopoly. Strankman and other farmers arrested received a pardon from Prime Minister Stephen Harper on August 1, 2012, when the federal government's Marketing Freedom for Grain Farmers Act came into effect, which allowed producers to opt out of the Canadian Wheat Board and sell wheat on the open market.

At a reunion with 12 of 13 farmers who had been jailed for taking wheat across the border, Strankman stood by his decision to participate in the act of civil disobedience. He served one week of a 180-day sentence.

Climate Change Controversy 
Strankman has been criticized for alleged Climate change denial. He has raised questions in the Legislative Assembly and in the media on whether anthropogenic climate change is real.

Electoral history

2019 general election

2015 general election

2012 general election

References

External links
Official website

Wildrose Party MLAs
1953 births
Farmers from Alberta
Living people
21st-century Canadian politicians
United Conservative Party MLAs